The 2020 Big Ten men's basketball tournament was the postseason men's basketball tournament for the Big Ten Conference of the 2019–20 NCAA Division I men's basketball season. The tournament remained in its more traditional Midwest roots as it was held at the Bankers Life Fieldhouse in Indianapolis, Indiana.

The first round games on March 11 were played with spectators in attendance. Later on March 11, the Big Ten conference announced that the remainder of the Big Ten tournament would proceed as scheduled but with no spectators in attendance due to the outbreak of the COVID-19 pandemic.

Also on March 11, the NCAA announced that no fans would be able to attend the men's and women's 2020 NCAA tournament games due to concerns about the outbreak of COVID-19. A number of college conferences followed suit by either cancelling their basketball tournaments entirely or limiting spectator attendance.

On March 12, the Big Ten announced the cancellation of the remainder of the tournament. 

The NCAA further announced that all remaining winter and spring championships for both men's and women's sports were canceled due to the pandemic.

Seeds
All 14 Big Ten schools were scheduled to participate in the tournament. Teams were seeded by conference record, with a tiebreaker system used to seed teams with identical conference records. The top 10 teams received a first round bye and the top four teams received a double bye. Tiebreaking procedures remained unchanged from the 2019 tournament.

Schedule

*Game times in Eastern Time. #Rankings denote tournament seeding.

Bracket

Game summaries

First round

See also
2020 Big Ten Conference women's basketball tournament

References

Tournament
Big Ten men's basketball tournament
Big Ten Conference men's basketball tournament
College sports tournaments in Indiana
Basketball competitions in Indianapolis
Big Ten Conference men's basketball tournament
Big Ten Conference men's basketball tournament